Masumabad (also Romanized as Ma‘şūmābād; also known as Gūrān-e Ma‘şūmābād) is a village in Abarj Rural District, Dorudzan District, Marvdasht County, Fars Province, Iran. At the 2006 census, its population was 200, in 39 families.

References 

Populated places in Marvdasht County